Dosinia maoriana is a medium-sized marine clam, a bivalve mollusc of the family Veneridae, or Venus clams.

References
 Powell A. W. B., New Zealand Mollusca, William Collins Publishers Ltd, Auckland, New Zealand 1979 

Dosinia
Bivalves of New Zealand
Molluscs described in 1923